Copahue is a stratovolcano in the Andes on the border of Bío Bío Region, Chile and Neuquén Province, Argentina.  There are nine volcanic craters along a  line, the easternmost of which is historically the most active, and contains a 300 m (1000 ft) wide crater lake with a pH ranging between 0.18 and 0.30.   Eruptions from this crater lake have ejected pyroclastic rocks and chilled liquid sulfur fragments.  Although the lake emptied during the 2000 eruption, it later returned to its previous levels. Copahue means "sulphur waters" in Mapuche.

Copahue sits on a basement of sedimentary and volcanic rocks ranging in age from Eocene to Pliocene. The modern volcano sits in a volcanically active area, with a caldera from the Pliocene, measuring 20 km by 15 km, lying to the east of Copahue. The modern volcano became active roughly 1.2 million years ago (Ma). The modern caldera formed 0.6 to 0.4 Ma, and produced large pyroclastic flows, extending up to 37 km from the volcano.

The modern structure is an elongated shield volcano, with a maximum thickness of 22 km and a minimum of 8 km.  It has erupted ten times since 1900, most recently in March 2016.  On 27 May 2013, it was reported that a red alert had been issued and the evacuation of around 2,000 people was to begin.

See also
 List of volcanoes in Chile
 List of volcanoes in Argentina

References

Bibliography
  (in Spanish; also includes volcanoes of Argentina, Bolivia, and Peru)

External links
 USGS Geologic Map of the Copahue Volcanics

Active volcanoes
Volcanoes of Biobío Region
Volcanoes of Neuquén Province
Stratovolcanoes of Chile
Stratovolcanoes of Argentina
Subduction volcanoes
Volcanic crater lakes
Argentina–Chile border
International mountains of South America
Mapuche language
Pleistocene stratovolcanoes
Holocene stratovolcanoes